Emiliano Lasa Sánchez (born January 25, 1990) is a Uruguayan track and field athlete who competes in the long jump. He won a bronze medal at the 2015 Pan American Games, as well as several others on continental level.

Competition record

References

Toronto 2015 profile

1990 births
Living people
Sportspeople from Montevideo
Uruguayan male long jumpers
Pan American Games medalists in athletics (track and field)
Athletes (track and field) at the 2011 Pan American Games
Athletes (track and field) at the 2015 Pan American Games
Athletes (track and field) at the 2019 Pan American Games
World Athletics Championships athletes for Uruguay
Athletes (track and field) at the 2016 Summer Olympics
Athletes (track and field) at the 2020 Summer Olympics
Olympic athletes of Uruguay
Pan American Games bronze medalists for Uruguay
South American Games gold medalists for Uruguay
South American Games silver medalists for Uruguay
South American Games medalists in athletics
Competitors at the 2014 South American Games
Athletes (track and field) at the 2018 South American Games
South American Championships in Athletics winners
Medalists at the 2015 Pan American Games
Medalists at the 2019 Pan American Games
South American Games gold medalists in athletics
21st-century Uruguayan people